Valmorea is a comune (municipality) in the Province of Como in the Italian region Lombardy, located about  northwest of Milan and about  west of Como.

Valmorea borders the following municipalities: Albiolo, Bizzarone, Cagno, Rodero, Uggiate-Trevano.

References

External links
 Official website

Cities and towns in Lombardy